The 10th Cortes Generales comprised both the lower (Congress) and upper (Senate) houses of the legislature of Spain following the 2011 general election on 20 November 2011. They first convened on 13 December 2011, and were dissolved on 27 October 2015.

The 2011 election saw 52 constituencies return 350 MPs for Congress and 208 for Senate. The People's Party (PP), led by Mariano Rajoy, obtained an absolute majority of seats with 186. The Spanish Socialist Workers' Party (PSOE) had its worst performance until that time and secured 110 seats. Minoritary parties United Left (IU) and Union, Progress and Democracy (UPyD) came out reinforced, with 11 and 5 seats, respectively, and over 1 million votes each.

Congress of Deputies

Composition

References

Members of the Cortes Generales